Värmland Brigade (IB 2) was a Swedish Army infantry brigade. Most of the brigade's soldiers were trained at the Värmland Regiment in Karlstad. The unit was disbanded as a result of the disarmament policies set forward in the Defence Act of 2000.

History 

The brigade was set up between 1949 and 1951. The brigade, together with the Värmland Regiment (I 2) was disbanded on 30 June 2000. The brigade's last commander was Colonel Björn Tomtlund.

Order of battle

Infantry battalions 

 1st Örnbataljonen (Eagle Battalion)
 2nd Vargbataljonen (Wolf Battalion)
 3rd Djerfbataljonen (Wolverine Battalion)
 4th Grenadjärbataljonen (Grenadier Battalion)

Maintenance Battalion

Howitzer Battalion

Engineer Battalion

Heraldry and traditions
The Värmland Brigade shared heraldry and traditions with the Värmland Regiment.

Coat of arms
The coat of the arms of the Värmland Brigade (IB 2) 1994–2000 which also was used by Värmland Regiment (I 2/Fo 52) 1977–1994. Blazon: "Argent, the provincial badge of Värmland, an eagle azure, wings elevated and displayed, armed and langued gules. The shield surmounted two muskets in saltire, or".

Medals
In 2000, the Värmlands regementes (I 2) och Värmlandsbrigadens (IB 2) minnesmedalj ("Värmland Regiment (I 2) and Värmland Brigade (IB 2) Commemorative Medal") in gold with black enamel (VärmlregbrigSMM) of the 8th size was established. The medal ribbon is of yellow moiré with broad black edges and two thinly placed red stripes on the middle. An eagle of gold is attached to the ribbon.

Commanding officers
Brigade commander from 1949 to 2000. During the years 1949–1994, the brigade commander was also acting commanding officer of Värmland Regiment.

1949–1980: ?
1980–1983: Lieutenant Colonel Jan Hage
1983–1988: Colonel Lennart Bergqvist
1988–1993: Colonel Ingvar S Klang
1993–1996: Tommy W Johansson
1997–2000: Björn Tomtlund (also regimental commander of Värmland Regiment from 1 April 2000)

Names, designations and locations

See also
 Värmland Regiment
 List of Swedish Army brigades

Footnotes

References

Notes

Print

Further reading

Brigades of the Swedish Army
Military units and formations established in 1949
Military units and formations disestablished in 2000
Disbanded units and formations of Sweden
1949 establishments in Sweden
2000 disestablishments in Sweden
Karlstad Garrison